Sibdon Carwood is a civil parish in Shropshire, England.  It contains nine listed buildings that are recorded in the National Heritage List for England.  Of these, two are listed at Grade II*, the middle of the three grades, and the others are at Grade II, the lowest grade.  The parish is almost completely rural, and the listed buildings consist of a country house and associated buildings, a church and two tombs in the churchyard, and three milestones.


Key

Buildings

References

Citations

Sources

Lists of buildings and structures in Shropshire